Darren Harris may refer to:
 Darren Harris (footballer, born 1965), Australian footballer for South Adelaide and North Melbourne
 Darren Harris (footballer, born 1968), Australian footballer for West Perth and coach for West Perth and Northern Bullants
 Darren Harris (Paralympian) (born 1973), Paralympic footballer and judoka